Gancia is an Italian wine-making company

Gancia may also refer to:

 Gancia (surname), Italian surname
 Santa Maria della Gancia, church in Palermo, Italy